Congenital muscular dystrophy-infantile cataract-hypogonadism syndrome is a very rare genetic disorder which is characterized by congenital muscular dystrophy, infantile-onset cataract, and hypogonadism. Males usually develop Klinefelter syndrome while females develop agenesis of the ovaries. It has been described in eight individuals of which seven came from Finnmark County, Norway. Inheritance pattern is thought to be autosomal recessive.

References 

Rare genetic syndromes
Muscular dystrophy
Finnmark
Chromosomal abnormalities